David John "Dai" Bowen (30 July 1891 – 15 April 1912) was a Welsh professional boxer, who died in the sinking of the , along with fellow Welsh boxer Leslie Williams.

Youth and training 
Bowen was born on 30 July 1891 at Baglan Street, Ystradyfodwg, near Treherbert to James Bowen and Leah (née Protheroe), the 7th of 8 children.  Originally a collier, Bowen left the mines to become a boxer and was later was trained to box by George Cundick, who had learnt his art as a physical training instructor with the British Army in India and who also had trained Leslie "Les" Williams, John Bowen's best friend. Dai Bowen won the Welsh lightweight title, and started boxing on the various British circuits.

Fights 
David John Bowen's professional fights were as follows:

1910  
2 April - Young Roberts (Treherbert), Pontypridd Millfield AC	                           
20 August – Jack Titt (Pentre)  
                                                                                      
1911
10 April – "Young" (Johnny) Walters (Pontypool), Pontypridd                            Millfield AC                                                                                            
14 October – Gus Venn (Pontypridd), Pontypridd Millfield AC                        
11 November – Batt McCarthy (Penarth), Hartlepool "Olympia"                     
rink
20 November – Gerry Delaney (Bradford), South Shields                                  
25 November – Billy Grant (Stockton), Hartlepool "Olympia" rink

1912 
5 March – "Young" Walters (Pontypool), Cardiff Park Hall (Dai’s last fight)

Voyage to America and death 
Cundick arranged for a series of boxing contests in the United States for both of his boxers including a fight with Packey McFarland, and they booked tickets with agents Dean and Dawson in Cardiff (ticket number 54636; 16 pounds, 2 shillings). Their ticket was a higher price than the regular steerage ticket as it allowed them access to the first class passengers' gym.

Dai and Les were originally due to sail for America on the Lusitania on Saturday 6 April 1912. They had to wait for Dai's new suit to arrive, which meant they found passage on the Titanic instead.

Boarding the Titanic at Southampton as third-class passengers, Bowen wrote a letter to his mother:

Both boxers died in the sinking, although Bowen's body was never recovered. The body of Williams was recovered by the CS Mackay-Bennett, and buried at sea on Monday 22 April 1912.

David John Bowen was 20 years old and single at his time of death. He lived at 42 Baglan Street, Treherbert with his widowed mother, remarried as Mrs Leah Owen and his youngest brother Stephen Bowen. Bowen's family paid for a grave site memorial in his honour to be erected in Treorchy Cemetery.

Stephen Bowen wrote the following poem as a tribute to the loss of his brother:

Notable relatives 
Bowen is the great-great uncle of the cartoonist David Squires, most notable for his work for The Guardian newspaper.

References

People from Treherbert
Sportspeople from Rhondda Cynon Taf
Welsh male boxers
Deaths on the RMS Titanic
1891 births
1912 deaths